Düsseldorf-Reisholz is a railway station situated at Reisholz, Düsseldorf in western Germany. It is served by Rhine-Ruhr S-Bahn line S 6 at 20-minute intervals and several services on line S68 during the peak.

References 

Railway stations in Düsseldorf
Railway stations in Germany opened in 1899
Rhine-Ruhr S-Bahn stations
S6 (Rhine-Ruhr S-Bahn)
S68 (Rhine-Ruhr S-Bahn)